Ghughurpatti is a village in Ambedkar Nagar district in the Indian state of Uttar Pradesh and is a sub post office of Rajesultanpur.

Demographics
As of 2011 Indian Census, Ghughurpatti had a total population of 193, of which 95 were males and 98 were females. Population within the age group of 0 to 6 years was 28. The total number of literates in Ghughurpatti was 131, which constituted 67.9% of the population with male literacy of 80.0% and female literacy of 56.1%. The effective literacy rate of 7+ population of Ghughurpatti was 79.4%, of which male literacy rate was 93.8% and female literacy rate was 65.5%. Ghughurpatti had 30 households in 2011.
Ghughurpatti' Village population is 210657.

Nearest city 
 Rajesultanpur 2 km
 Maharajganj 2 km
 Tanda 52 km
 Azamgarh 28 km
 Gorakhpur 60 km
 Faizabad 122 km

References

Villages in Ambedkar Nagar district